James Joseph "J.J." Foy (February 22, 1847 – June 13, 1916) was an Ontario lawyer and political figure. He represented Toronto South in the Legislative Assembly of Ontario as a Conservative member from 1898 to 1916.

He was born in Toronto, the son of Patrick Foy, a Toronto merchant, and educated at St. Michael's College, Toronto and Ushaw College. He was called to the bar in 1871 and set up practice with a law firm in Toronto. In 1879, he married Marie Cuvillier. Foy was named Queen's Counsel in 1883.

He served as Attorney General from 1905 to 1914. Foy helped finance the Catholic Register, a Catholic weekly newspaper based in Toronto.

He died in office in 1916.

Notes

External links 
 

1847 births
1916 deaths
Progressive Conservative Party of Ontario MPPs
Attorneys General of Ontario
Canadian Roman Catholics
University of Toronto alumni
Alumni of Ushaw College
Canadian King's Counsel